Pax Deorum may refer to:

"Pax Deorum", a song from The Memory of Trees, an album by Enya
"Pax Deorum", a cover of the aforementioned song from the album Maiden of Mysteries: The Music of Enya, by the Taliesin Orchestra
Pax deorum, a Latin phrase meaning "peace of the gods"